Hunan is a province of China.

Hunan may also refer to these places in China:

Hunan Subdistrict, a subdistrict of Tiedong District, Anshan, Liaoning
Hunan Township, a township in Fuzhou, Jiangsu
Hunan, Fujian, a town in Fuzhou, Fujian
Hunan, Zhejiang, a town in Quzhou, Zhejiang

See also
Hunan cuisine
Honam (in South Korea)